The Hired Man is a 1918 American silent comedy film written and directed by Victor Schertzinger. The film stars Charles Ray, Charles K. French, Robert Gordon, Doris May, Lydia Knott, and William Fairbanks. The film was released on January 27, 1918, by Paramount Pictures.

Plot
As described in a film magazine, Ezry (Ray), the farm's hired man, in love with his employer's daughter Ruth (May), is anxious to obtain an education. When Ruth learns of his ambitions, she assists him in his studies. With enough money saved to go to college, on the way to the railroad depot he stops to say farewell to Ruth's brother Walter (Gordon), and there learns that it will take just that amount of money to keep Walter out of prison for stealing money from the bank where he works. Ezry returns to the farm. That night there is a dance, and after everyone has left, Ruth goes to Ezry to teach him how to dance. They are seen by a jealous suitor of Ruth's who tells her father Caleb (French), which results in the discharge of Ezry. Leaving that night, Ezry looks back at the farm and sees that the house is on fire. He rushes back and rescues Walter amid falling timbers. The brother tells everyone why Ezry did not go to college, and Ezry is welcomed back at the farm as a member of the family.

Cast
Charles Ray as Ezry Hollins
Charles K. French as Caleb Endicott (credited as Charles French)
Robert Gordon as Walter Endicott (credited as Gilbert Gordon)
Doris May as Ruth Endicott
Lydia Knott as Mrs. Endicott
William Fairbanks as Stuart Morley (credited as Carl Ullman)

References

External links 
 

1918 films
1910s English-language films
Silent American comedy films
1918 comedy films
Paramount Pictures films
Films directed by Victor Schertzinger
American black-and-white films
American silent feature films
1910s American films